Beaumont Street is a street in the centre of Oxford, England.

The street was laid out from 1828 to 1837 with elegant terraced houses in the Regency style. Before that, it was the location of Beaumont Palace, now noted by a plaque near the junction with Walton Street. Nikolaus Pevsner considered it "the finest street ensemble of Oxford."

Richard I of England (reigned 6 July 1189 – 6 April 1199) and John, King of England who succeeded him (reigned 6 April 1199 – 19 October 1216), both sons of Henry II of England, were born at Beaumont Palace in Oxford on 8 September 1157 and 24 December 1166 respectively.

At the western end is Worcester College and the junction with Walton Street to the north and Worcester Street to the south. Halfway along to the north is St John Street. To the south is the Oxford Playhouse, designed by Sir Edward Maufe and built in 1938, where many University productions are held. To the north at the eastern end is the Ashmolean Museum. Opposite the eastern end is the Martyrs' Memorial. Here, Beaumont Street adjoins St Giles' to the north and Magdalen Street to the south. Oxford's foremost hotel, the Randolph, is on the corner with Magdalen Street, designed by William Wilkinson in the Victorian Gothic style and built in 1864. An extension was added in 1952 to the west, designed by J. Hopgood.

The Institute of Archaeology, part of the School of Archaeology in the University of Oxford, was established in 1962 and is located at 36 Beaumont Street.

In poem "Wherefrom", Francis William Bourdillon a British poet and translator wrote about Beaumont Street legend:

Just at the end of Beaumont Street,
In front of Worcester walls,
Strange shrieks of woe the passer greet,
As every footstep falls.

The street is a favoured location for dentists and doctors.

Gallery

References

External links

 Oxford Guide information

1828 establishments in England
Streets in Oxford
Art gallery districts
Worcester College, Oxford